Denny Hickey (14 May 1889 Connellsville, Pennsylvania – 10 August 1965 Connellsville, Pennsylvania) was an American racecar driver.

Hickey made 18 AAA Championship Car starts between 1917 and 1919, including the 1919 Indianapolis 500. He finished 16th in the 1919 National Championship. His best race finish was third twice on the Uniontown Speedway board oval in 1919. He drove a Hudson for his entire career.

Indy 500 results

References

Indianapolis 500 drivers
1889 births
1965 deaths
People from Connellsville, Pennsylvania
Racing drivers from Pennsylvania